
Asma (Ancient Greek „Άσμα“||ʾAsmāʾ) is a feminine given name of Ancient Greek origin meaning “beautiful song or poem”. Esma is a Bosnian and Turkish variant. It is in use in the Arab world and Muslim-majority countries.In Iraq its variant is „Basma“.

Notable people with the given name include:

Historical
 Asmā' bint Abu Bakr (c.595 – 692 CE), companion of the Islamic prophet Mohammed and elder sister of his wife Aisha
 Asma bint Atta, was the wife of Abbasid caliph al-Mahdi (r. 775–785) until her divorce after a few months.
 Asma bint Abd al-Rahman ibn al-Harith, was the prominent member clan of Banu Makhzum and mother-in-law of Umayyad prince Abd al-Aziz.
 Asma bint Khumarawayh, better known as Qatr al-Nada was the wife of Abbasid caliph al-Mu'tadid (r. 892–902).

 Asma bint Marwan, 7th century Arabian Jewish female poet

 Asma bint Shihab (d. 1087), Yemeni Queen

20th–21st century
 Asma Afsaruddin, American academic
 Asma Ben Ahmed, Tunisian singer
 Asma al-Assad, First Lady of Syria
 Asma Barlas, (b.1950) American academic
 Asma Gull Hasan, Pakistani-American award-winning writer
 Asma Jahangir, Pakistani lawyer
 Asma Othmani, Tunisian singer

Notes

See also
Aasmah Mir

Arabic feminine given names
Pakistani feminine given names